M. A. Breeden (1849 – October 19, 1916) was an American politician who served as the Attorney General of Utah from 1901 to 1909.

He died on October 19, 1916, in Redondo Beach, California.

References

1849 births
1916 deaths
Utah Attorneys General
Utah Republicans